The Indonesian giant sailfin dragon (Hydrosaurus microlophus) is a species of agamid native to south sulawesi Indonesia. It is the heaviest and longest species of sailfin lizard, making it the largest of all the Agamidae. It is often mistaken for its counterpart because of the incorrect information of Hydrosaurus Amboinensis being the largest of the sailfin dragons.

Reproduction
H. microlophus is oviparous.

References

Reptiles of Indonesia
Reptiles described in 1860
Taxa named by Pieter Bleeker
microlophus